The 1930–31 Rugby Union County Championship was the 38th edition of England's premier rugby union club competition at the time.

Gloucestershire won the competition for the seventh time after defeating Warwickshire in the final.

Final

See also
 English rugby union system
 Rugby union in England

References

Rugby Union County Championship
County Championship (rugby union) seasons